Banistmo is the largest bank in Panama and Central America. It was founded in 1984 as Primer Banco del Istmo before it became part of the HSBC Group following its former parent company, Grupo Banistmo's acquisition by HSBC in November 2006. It was the subsidiary of HSBC Bank (Panama) S.A. until it merged into HSBC Bank (Panama) in 2009. In 2013 Bancolombia Group acquired HSBC Panama and renamed it as Banistmo.

See also

HSBC Mexico
HSBC Bank (Panama)
Alberto Vallarino Clement

References

Banks of Panama
HSBC acquisitions
Companies based in Panama City